× Cyrtellia, abbreviated in trade journals Cyrtl, is an intergeneric hybrid between the orchid genera Ansellia and Cyrtopodium (Aslla x Cyrt).

References 

Cymbidieae
Orchid nothogenera